Winifred May Copperwheat (10 October 190523 February 1976) was an English classical viola player and teacher.

She studied under English violist Lionel Tertis at the Royal Academy of Music. Tertis later said after one of her recitals, that she had "played like an angel".

As soloist, she gave the premiere performances of several works, including:
 Theodore Holland, Ellingham Marshes for viola and orchestra; with the London Symphony Orchestra under Henry Wood at The Proms in 1940
 Theodore Holland, a composition for viola and piano; with Iris Greep, 1941
 Priaulx Rainier, Viola Sonata; with Antony Hopkins (piano) at the National Gallery, London in 1946
 Frank Stiles, Four Pieces for Solo Viola (1959), composed for her
 Frank Stiles, Viola Concerto No. 1, composed for and dedicated to her (1955, first performance 1962) 

She played in several chamber music combinations; including the Zorian String Quartet, of which she was a founding member. She participated in several premiere performances and recordings by the Zorian Quartet.

For many years, she taught viola at the Royal Academy of Music. In 1971, she pointed out to musicologist and violist Martin Jarvis, one of her students, some problems with the published editions of the Bach cello suites. That observation eventually led to his hypothesis that they had been composed by Anna Magdalena Bach and not, as commonly supposed, by her husband Johann Sebastian Bach.

She wrote a book designed for beginning viola students, The First-Year Viola Method.

Her name is inscribed in the Book of Remembrance in the Musicians' Chapel at St Sepulchre-without-Newgate, London.

Notes

References 

1905 births
1976 deaths
Alumni of the Royal Academy of Music
Academics of the Royal Academy of Music
English classical violists
Women violists
Musicians from London
20th-century classical musicians
20th-century violists